The blue carriages are passenger cars built between 1961 and 1987 used by VR for long-distance passenger travel in Finland.



History 
The first 15 units were built in Germany by Maschinenfabrik Esslingen in 1961. The model was later copied by VR and manufacturing started in VR's own machine workshop in Pasila in 1964. Over 600 units were built up until 1987. Most are capable of speeds up to 140 to 160 kilometers of hour. They are slowly being phased out in favour of the more modern InterCity-coaches. Some are still used in night trains from Helsinki to Kolari and Rovaniemi and in commuter trains from Helsinki to Kouvola.

List of cars currently used in passenger trains

See also 
VR Class Eil

References

External links 
Pictures of blue cars at vaunut.org 

Railway coaches of Finland